Feltham railway station serves Feltham in the London Borough of Hounslow, west London. It was opened on 22 August 1848 by the Windsor, Staines and South Western Railway (later the London and South Western Railway).

Two regular bus routes run from the main road, to its east, to and from differing parts of Heathrow Airport.

Facilities
A central, internal footbridge with stairs and lifts connects the platforms.  To the west nearby is a footbridge and beyond that another that allows crossing by ramps and connects part of the town's 21st-century shopping/restaurants plaza to the eastbound side and a small part of Feltham, beyond which is Bedfont.  The high street of Feltham starts 100 metres south and somewhat more, east.

A small shop, ticket machines and seating area are in the booking hall before the ticket barriers on the northern platform (1, eastbound or 'up').  Covered seating, vending machines, toilets and a coffee kiosk serve the platform.

The southern platform (2, westbound, or 'Down') hosts the bulk of the original station house. Two near-adjoining entrances, a small shop, automatic ticket machines and covered seating serve the platform. The mid-19th century former house is at the northern extremity of Feltham's principal architectural conservation area, taking in Hanworth Road, lined primarily with detached late Victorian houses.

The southern forecourt hosts a taxi rank, small car park and bays for courtesy buses to local employers (and if any track is closed, rail replacement bus services).

History

Before World War II a main station entrance was built on the road bridge carrying Hounslow Road across the line – this and a footbridge were demolished in the early 1990s.  A former Red Star Parcels office is vacant space in the southerly station house.

Adjacent land, once used in the rail sector, has become a supermarket and a private sports centre; to the east of the station was Feltham marshalling yard, one of the largest marshalling yards in the British Isles (1917–67) and a motive power depot.

Construction of the booking hall, internal bridge, their accessways and most facilities on the northern side dates to the 1990s.  This was built under the SWELTRAC partnership between local authorities, Heathrow Airport Ltd (part of BAA), and the rail industry to boost public transport, including easy rail/bus interchange. Its apron/forecourt, for buses, fronts the southwestern part of New Road (and it fronts Bedfont Lane, with semi-open pavements to both).

Until March 2019, there was a level crossing at the station's west end, carrying part of Bedfont Lane; the crossing was closed altogether and the road split in two that year.

Services
The typical hourly off-peak weekday service from the station is:

 6 to London Waterloo, of which:
 2 call at only , Richmond, and 
 2 call at all stations on the Hounslow Loop
 2 to  calling at  then all stations.

On Sundays the typical hourly service is:
 5 to London Waterloo, of which:
 3 call at Whitton, Twickenham, Richmond, Putney, Clapham Junction, and Vauxhall.
 1 calls at all stations via Richmond.
 1 calls at all stations on the Hounslow Loop.
 2 tph to Windsor & Eton Riverside, of which:
 1 calls at Ashford (Surrey), Staines, and Datchet
 1 calls at Ashford (Surrey), Staines, and 
 1 tph to Woking, calling at all intermediate stations.
2 tph to Reading calling at Staines then all stations.

Connections

Heathrow Airport
Feltham is one of the nearest rail stations to Heathrow Airport, especially to Terminal 4, and it is identified as a connection for the airport both by signs at the station, and in timetables. Route 285 links directly to the airport's Central Bus Station, which is between terminals 2 and 3; while Route 490 runs to terminals 4 and 5. (There is no terminal 1.)

A high street and suburb-serving bus, Route H25, greets the London-bound platform's forecourt (immediately outside of Platform 1) which thus assists passengers who need any assistance to reach the main choice of bus stops a few hundred yards to the east and north-east.

Since March 2008's opening of the newest terminal, route 490 has been extended, westerly, to Heathrow Terminal 5.

The two routes serve the same local stops up until Hatton Cross.

Historic express buses
A shuttle (express) bus fleet served the airport from 1999: Route T123 for the Central Bus Station, and route T4 for terminal 4. In 2000 T4 was withdrawn and the frequency of T123 cut. Until 2008 their replacement was the existing route 285 which until 2020 had a traffic-light junction detour; passengers for terminal 4 were advised to change at Hatton Cross (with free rail services, underground, to the four active terminals).

Local buses
All are London Buses. Route H25 serves the station immediately.

The main street, which is to the east and more importantly, as to stops, north-east is served by routes 90, 117, 235, 285, 490 and H26.

Proposals
The station's track lay in the now abandoned Heathrow Airtrack plan proposed by BAA. BAA withdrew the Airtrack plan in 2011.

Smaller proposals have followed. Hounslow Council, in 2016, consulted on a direct railway, with passenger services, between the line and Terminal 5 of Heathrow. The plan was again disbanded.

References

External links

Railway stations in the London Borough of Hounslow
Former London and South Western Railway stations
Railway stations in Great Britain opened in 1848
Railway stations served by South Western Railway
Airport railway stations in the United Kingdom
Railway and tube stations serving Heathrow Airport